Mario Luis Bergara de Medina (1 December 1937 – 28 February 2001) was a uruguayan football player from. He played for Uruguay at the 1962 FIFA World Cup, he also played for Racing Club de Montevideo, Club Nacional de Football and Montevideo Wanderers. He was brother of Danny Bergara.

Teams

Honors

References

External links
FIFA profile

1937 births
2001 deaths
Uruguayan footballers
Uruguay international footballers
Association football forwards
Montevideo Wanderers F.C. players
Club Nacional de Football players
Racing Club de Montevideo players
Uruguayan Primera División players
1962 FIFA World Cup players
Copa América-winning players